Winelight is a 1980 studio album by jazz musician Grover Washington Jr. The record received the Grammy Award for Best Jazz Fusion Performance in 1982.  The album was released by Elektra Records. It includes the Grammy Award-winning hit "Just the Two of Us" sung by Bill Withers. The track "In the Name of Love" from the album was also released in rearranged form, without Washington's saxophone track, under the name of Ralph MacDonald and Bill Withers (on vocals).

Reception
Scott Yanow of AllMusic wrote "A memorable set of high-quality and danceable soul-jazz".

Track listing
Side One
 "Winelight" (William Eaton) – 7:32
 "Let It Flow (For "Dr. J")" (Grover Washington Jr.) – 5:52
 "In the Name of Love" (William Salter, Ralph MacDonald) – 5:26

Side Two
 "Take Me There" (Washington) – 6:16
 "Just the Two of Us" (Bill Withers, William Salter, Ralph MacDonald) – 7:23
 "Make Me a Memory (Sad Samba)" (Washington) – 6:32

Personnel 
 Grover Washington Jr. – alto saxophone, soprano saxophone, tenor saxophone
 Richard Tee – Fender Rhodes (1, 3, 5, 6)
 Ray Chew – clavinet (1)
 Paul Griffin – clavinet (1), Fender Rhodes (2, 4)
 Ed Walsh – Oberheim 8-Voice (1-4, 6)
 Bill Eaton – Oberheim 8-Voice (5), arrangements and conductor 
 Eric Gale – guitars
 Marcus Miller – bass
 Steve Gadd – drums
 Ralph MacDonald – congas, percussion, Syndrums
 Robert Greenidge – steel drums
 Hilda Harris, Yvonne Lewis, Ullanda McCullough – backing vocals 
 Bill Withers – lead vocals (5)

Production 
 Grover Washington Jr. – producer 
 Ralph MacDonald – producer 
 Richard Alderson – engineer 
 Ed Heath – assistant engineer 
 Vlado Meller – mastering at CBS Studios (New York City, New York).
 Paul Silverthorn – production coordinator 
 Ron Coro – art direction, design 
 Jim Shea – cover photography 
 Don Hunstein – inner sleeve photography

Charts

Album

Singles

Certifications

External links
 Grover Washington Jr. – Winelight at Discogs

References

1980 albums
Elektra Records albums
Grover Washington Jr. albums
Grammy Award for Best Jazz Fusion Performance